Athletics at the 2015 European Games took place at the Baku National Stadium and on the streets of Baku, Azerbaijan.

Program
The main athletics programme in the National Stadium was a combined European Games and 2015 European Team Championships Third League  competition. It is the lowest league of the Team Championships, with 17 teams from smaller European athletics nations, including Azerbaijan.

600 athletes in total – competed over two days for points in 20 men's and women's track and field events. Points were to be combined to produce national team totals, and games medals awarded to the top three nations. Medals are not awarded for individual events. The top four nations also win promotion from the Third League of the European Team Championships to the Second League.

As required by the European Team Championship format, both genders compete in the non-Olympic 3000m event, while Olympic events longer than 5000m, and combined events, are not held. Athletics at the European Games offers possible qualification standards for the Rio 2016 Summer Olympics.

A second non-medal athletics competition was held as a series of demonstration events on the streets of Baku in a Great City Games format. Events include the high jump and pole vault, and 24 athletes were scheduled to compete. Plans to include street running races were reportedly cancelled.

Athletics was not included in the earliest list of sports confirmed for the 2015 Games, as the European Athletics authorities at that stage were minded not to take part. However, following negotiations with the organising authorities, a compromise was reached in February 2014 between the organisers and European Athletics to hold the two sets of competitions. The agreement was confirmed by Pat Hickey, president of the European Olympic Committees in February 2015.

Medal summary

Participating countries
The following countries are scheduled to take part in the team event.

 AASSE1 (18)
 (15)
 (23)
 (48)
 (35)
 (40)
 (37)
 (43)
 (40)
 (30)
 (36)
 (29)
 (30)
 (48)

1 Consists of athletes from San Marino (9),  Gibraltar (4), Liechtenstein (4) and Monaco (1).

Results

Score table

Final standings

Doping
Azerbaijan's Chaltu Beji – the winner of the women's steeplechase event – was disqualified after her in-competition drug test came back positive for the banned substance ostarine.

Azerbaijan's Dzmitry Marshin was suspended for four years after he failed a drug test. This subsequent doping disqualification led to changes in final standings. Austria received an additional point and overhauled Slovakia.

In 2022 Elisabeth Niedereder of Austria had all her results since May 2015 annulled by World Athletics and Austria were docked 11 points meaning that the gold medal reverted back to Slovakia after 7 years

References 

 
2015
Athletics
European Games
European Games